Calvert County is located in the U.S. state of Maryland. As of the 2020 census, the population was 92,783. Its county seat is Prince Frederick. The county's name is derived from the family name of the Barons of Baltimore, the proprietors of the English Colony of Maryland Calvert County is included in the Washington–Arlington–Alexandria, DC–VA–MD–WV Metropolitan Statistical Area. It occupies the Calvert Peninsula, which is bordered on the east by Chesapeake Bay and on the west by the Patuxent River. Calvert County is part of the Southern Maryland region. The county has one of the highest median household incomes in the United States. It is one of the older counties in Maryland, after St. Mary's, Kent County and Anne Arundel counties.

History

Early History
In  1608, Captain John Smith was the first European to sail past Calvert County while exploring the western shore of the Chesapeake Bay. On his map, he accurately represented the Patuxent River as well as several Native-American villages. The area was described as wooded and had been occupied by the Patuxent people who were overall peaceful to the early Europeans. Their diet was composed of fish from the river and corn cultivated in man-made clearings with a supplement of game from the forests. These clearings were very desirable and conflict occurred when the settlers attempted to seize these areas from the Native Americans. Leonard Calvert, the first Governor of the Maryland, organized troops of armed men in 1639 to protect the settlers.

The first written mention of European settlers on the northern shore of the Patuxent River is found in the records of the Maryland Assembly in 1642. A Henry Bishop "stood up in the Assembly and exhibited himself as a Burgess of St. Leonard's and pleaded that it be acknowledged as a Hundred" near St. Leonard's Creek. This shows that European settlement along the river and its tributaries had been taking place for several years already.

By 1646, the colonists had spread all along the Patuxent River and up the Bay side of Calvert County. Most of the transportation of goods and people took place on the water as the land was occupied by dense forests. Large creeks were navigated by sailing boats and plantations used their wharves to ship good. Ferry services were setup across the river and the bay with rates fixed by law.

Creation of Charles County
The county was originally named Charles County (much larger and unrelated to the present-day Charles County)  in 1650 when Cecil Calvert, 2nd Baron Baltimore established it with Robert Brooke as its "Commander". It was named after Charles I of England. At the time, the new county included the current area of Calver County as well as the southern and western shores of the Patuxent River up to its headwaters. The county seat was called Calverton (sometimes called Battle Town) and was located on the north shore at the mouth of Battle Creek until 1725. In 1658, the county was renamed Calvert County. It also included all of Prince George's County and parts of Montgomery County.

Puritans coming from Virginia had settled in Anne Arundel County and overflowed into Calvert County. All new settlers in Maryland were required to take an oath of allegiance to Lord Baltimore per the "Conditions of Plantation". This was a major point of tension between the Puritan settlers and Lord Baltimore. The civil war was ongoing in Britain where the Puritans had gained control. Oliver Cromwell dismissed Parliament there and assumed the role of Lord Protector. In 1652, he sent a force of 750 men to subdue the plantations of the Chesapeake Bay under the new government. Virginia and Maryland surrendered to the Puritans and Robert Brooke cooperated with the Puritans.

On July 3, 1654, Lord Baltimore abolished Charles County and removed all authority from Brooke. He re-established the county as Calvert County with the same territory. However, the Puritan Assembly was in power and changed the name to Patuxent County on October 20, 1654, after the Patuxent River and to remove any connection with the Calvert family. The county kept this name under the Puritan regime until 1658 when the name of Calvert County was restored.

According to the local "Trail of Souls Project", in 1860 there were 4,609 enslaved people, 1,841 free people of color for a total county population of 10,000 people.

Once made up primarily of farms and tobacco fields, the county's agriculture transformed in the mid-1990s. The prices for tobacco were declining. The State of Maryland instituted the Tobacco Buyout program which offered farmers to transition to different crops and away from tobacco. 195 contracts were signed between Calvert county farmers and property owners and The Southern Maryland Agricultural Development Commission. The funds were used for infrastructure and equipment upgrades. Today the county produces fruits, vegetables, meat as well as other crops.

The county has become a fast-growing exurban neighbor of Washington. Many home prices have nearly quadrupled in the past decade, with many four-bedroom homes in the northern half of the county averaging over $1,000,000. The popular weekend resort towns of Solomons, Chesapeake Beach, and North Beach are notable.

The county has numerous properties on the National Register of Historic Places.

Politics and government

County Government
Calvert County is governed by a Board composed of five elected County Commissioners, the traditional form of county government in the State of Maryland. They meet in Prince Frederick, the county seat.

National Politics

|}

In the early 19th Century, in the contests between the Hamiltonian Federalist and Jeffersonian Democratic-Republican parties of the First Party System, it backed the Federalists four out of seven times, only going for the Democratic-Republicans in their greatest landslides of 1804 and 1816 as well as the 1820 election in which President James Monroe ran effectively unopposed.

In the 1824 election which began the second party system, the people of Calvert County voted for John Quincy Adams over Andrew Jackson, who would go on to help found the Democratic Party before the 1828 election. Up until the Civil War, Calvert County voted only for the candidates of the Whig Party, the Democrat's primary opposition. After that party's dissolution in the early 1850s, it supported the Nativist Know-Nothing party in 1856 and the largely Whiggish Constitutional Union party in 1860.

In the Civil War election of 1864, Calvert swung sharply along with the rest of southern Maryland to give over 90% of the vote to Democratic challenger George McClellan, and again to the Democratic standard-bearer Horatio Seymour four years later. The brief Democratic era was likely due to strong Confederate sympathy in Southern Maryland.

In Presidential elections, Calvert County has historically and at present leaned strongly towards the Republican Party. It was won by that party in every election from 1884 to 1936 – with the sequence broken in 1940 due to local support for Franklin Delano Roosevelt's efforts at helping Britain in World War II – and in modern times no Democratic presidential nominee has won Calvert County since Jimmy Carter did so in 1976.

Since then, Calvert County has remained mostly aligned with the Republican Party. It briefly turned in favor of the Democrats in the dealigned 1960s and 70s, after which it became a Republican stronghold in the 1980s. In modern elections, it leans Republican though Democrats have gained votes. President Joe Biden came only 5% from winning the county in 2020, the closest any Democrat has come since Jimmy Carter carried it in 1976.

It is part of the 5th Congressional District, along with much of Southern Maryland. The current representative is Democratic House Majority Leader Steny Hoyer.

Geography

It is the smallest county in Maryland by land area and third-smallest by total area. The county also includes five islands: Solomons Island, Broomes Island, Buzzard Island, Hog Island, and Molly's Leg.

The county's coast along the Chesapeake Bay is a long, relatively smooth bight, a feature that is unique in the Chesapeake Bay.

Geology
A geological formation spanning across Maryland, Virginia, and Delaware is named after the county: the Calvert Formation. It is visible within the Calvert Cliffs State Park where it is exposed in cliffs. Located on the western shore of the county, Calvert Cliffs are famous for their fossil deposits and are a popular collecting location of marine vertebrates, shark teeth, birds as well as fresh water and marine turtles and tortoises. Some crocodile teeth have also been found which indicates that they may have been nesting in the sands at the time the formation was created.

The county landscape is composed of three platforms: the Talbot Terrace, the Wicomico Terrace, and the Sunderland Terrace (also known as the Ridge). These terraces correspond to three periods where the water level rose and later fell, leaving sand deposits. The oldest was created during the Miocene Age when the entire county peninsula found itself underwater. Marine deposits, clay, and mud containing sea shells and fossils were left behind leading to what we see at Calvert Cliffs today after the sea receded and the waves started erroring the deposit. These three terraces are visible in various parts of the county and are most obvious on the Bay side of the county where they rise to a height of 100 feet.

Climate
Calvert County lies in the humid subtropical climate zone (Cfa) in the Köppen climate classification, with hot, humid summers and mild to chilly winters with plentiful precipitation year-round. In the Trewartha climate classification the county is classified as oceanic (Do) except in the extreme south which is Cf. Its proximity to the Chesapeake Bay has a moderating effect on temperatures compared with locales further inland. Average monthly temperatures in Prince Frederick range from 35.9 °F in January to 77.9 °F in July.

Adjacent counties
 Anne Arundel County (north)
 Prince George's County (northwest)
 Charles County (west)
 Dorchester County (east)
 Talbot County (northeast)
 St. Mary's County (south)

Demographics

2000 census
As of the census of 2000, there were 74,563 people, 25,447 households, and 20,154 families residing in the county. The population density was 346 people per square mile (134/km2). There were 27,576 housing units at an average density of 128 per square mile (49/km2). The racial makeup of the county was 83.93% White, 13.11% Black or African American, 0.30% Native American, 0.88% Asian, 0.03% Pacific Islander, 0.49% from other races, and 1.27% from two or more races. 1.52% of the population were Hispanic or Latino of any race. 15.5% were of Irish, 15.0% German, 12.0% English, 11.5% United States or American and 7.1% Italian ancestry.

There were 25,447 households, out of which 41.70% had children under the age of 18 living with them, 64.80% were married couples living together, 9.90% had a female householder with no husband present, and 20.80% were non-families. 16.30% of all households were made up of individuals, and 5.70% had someone living alone who was 65 years of age or older. The average household size was 2.91 and the average family size was 3.26.

In the county, the population was spread out, with 29.60% under the age of 18, 6.40% from 18 to 24, 31.70% from 25 to 44, 23.40% from 45 to 64, and 8.90% who were 65 years of age or older. The median age was 36 years. For every 100 females there were 97.30 males. For every 100 females age 18 and over, there were 94.00 males.

The median income for a household in the county was $65,945, and the median income for a family was $71,545 (these figures had risen to $88,989 and $100,229 respectively as of a 2007 estimate). Males had a median income of $48,664 versus $32,265 for females. The per capita income for the county was $25,410. About 3.10% of families and 4.40% of the population were below the poverty line, including 5.10% of those under age 18 and 5.70% of those age 65 or over.

2010 census
As of the 2010 United States Census, there were 88,737 people, 30,873 households, and 23,732 families residing in the county. The racial makeup of the county was 81.4% white, 13.4% black or African American, 1.4% Asian, 0.4% American Indian, 0.7% from other races, and 2.7% from two or more races. Those of Hispanic or Latino origin made up 2.7% of the population. In terms of ancestry, 19.6% were German, 17.6% were Irish, 13.9% were English, 8.4% were Italian, and 7.4% were American.

Of the 30,873 households, 40.4% had children under the age of 18 living with them, 60.6% were married couples living together, 11.3% had a female householder with no husband present, 23.1% were non-families, and 18.1% of all households were made up of individuals. The average household size was 2.85 and the average family size was 3.23. The median age was 40.1 years.

The median income for a household in the county was $90,838 and the median income for a family was $102,638. Males had a median income of $66,909 versus $49,337 for females. The per capita income for the county was $36,323. About 2.8% of families and 4.4% of the population were below the poverty line, including 5.3% of those under age 18 and 5.3% of those age 65 or over.

According to the 2010 Census the racial and ethnic make-up of the Calvert County Population was 79.65% Non-Hispanic whites, 13.44% blacks, 0.37% Native Americans, 1.42% Asians, 0.05% Pacific Islanders, 0.12% Non-Hispanics reporting some other race, 2.40% Non-Hispanics reporting multiple races and 2.75% Hispanic.

Economy
Calvert Cliffs Nuclear Power Plant is located on the western shore of Chesapeake Bay at Lusby, as is the Cove Point LNG Terminal.

The Chesapeake Biological Laboratory, part of the University of Maryland Center for Environmental Science is located in Solomons.

A branch of the United States Naval Research Laboratory is located at Chesapeake Beach.

The Patuxent River Naval Air Station is located immediately to the south of Calvert County, in St. Mary's County.

Top employers
According to the county's 2019 Comprehensive Annual Financial Report, the top employers in the county are:

Education
Calvert County is served by Calvert County Public Schools. The county's education system consists of 13 elementary schools, six middle schools, four high schools, vocational education center, and a variety of other facilities. There is also one private K-12 school, The Calverton School.

Transportation

The main artery serving Calvert County is Maryland Route 4 (which begins in Washington, D.C. as Pennsylvania Avenue before crossing into Prince George's County, Maryland and Anne Arundel County, Maryland). Route 4 in Calvert County begins at the very northern tip of the county at Lyons Creek, approximately 3 miles north of Dunkirk. At Sunderland, Route 4 meets Maryland Route 2 (traveling south as a two-lane road from Annapolis) and the two roads merge as Maryland Route 2–4. Route 2-4 continues south through Prince Frederick, St. Leonard and Lusby. At Solomons, Routes 2 and 4 split again, with Route 2 heading towards downtown Solomons and Route 4 crossing the Patuxent River at the Governor Thomas Johnson Bridge into St. Mary's County.

Route 2-4 is designated Solomons Island Road throughout much of the county, with the section south of Prince Frederick being recently renamed Louis Goldstein Highway in memory of Louis L. Goldstein, the former comptroller of Maryland and Calvert County resident.

In the 1970s and 1980s, Route 2-4 underwent an extensive expansion project, with the formerly two-lane road becoming a four-lane dual highway. Certain portions of the highway were re-aligned, with the former roadway becoming Maryland Route 765. The final portion of the dualized Route 2-4 between St. Leonard and Solomons was completed in 1988. In 2009, a portion of Route 2–4 in Prince Frederick was expanded to three lanes, along with sidewalks added.

Other major roadways in Calvert County include:
 Maryland Route 231, which travels west from Prince Frederick to the Patuxent River, ultimately crossing the river at the Benedict Bridge into Charles County.
 Maryland Route 260, which starts at an overpass interchange at the Calvert-Anne Arundel border and travels southeast to Chesapeake Beach. A portion of Route 260 is a four-lane dual highway.

Communities

Towns
 Chesapeake Beach
 North Beach

Census-designated places
The Census Bureau recognizes the following census-designated places in the county:

 Broomes Island
 Calvert Beach 
 Chesapeake Ranch Estates
 Drum Point
 Dunkirk
 Huntingtown
 Long Beach
 Lusby
 Owings
 Prince Frederick (county seat)
 St. Leonard
 Solomons

Dunkirk, Huntingtown, Lusby, Owings, Prince Frederick, St. Leonard and Solomons have all been designated by Calvert County government as being "town centers". The "town center" designation means while these communities may not have incorporated central governments, they do have specified boundaries surrounding the central business and residential areas for zoning purposes. The reason behind the "town center" designation is to cluster new development within established areas with existing infrastructure, thus discouraging urban sprawl. The implementation of the "town center" concept in Calvert County over the past two decades has for the most part been successful in preserving rural and agricultural areas outside the designated "town centers", and stands as a key example of the smart growth planning strategy.

Unincorporated communities

 Adelina
 Barstow
 Bowens
 Chaneyville
 Dares Beach
 Dowell
 Johnstown
 Lower Marlboro
 Mutual
 Parran
 Pleasant Valley
 Port Republic
 Scientists Cliffs
 Stoakley
 Sunderland
 Wallville
 Wilson

Notable people
 Louisa Adams, First Lady of the United States, wife of President John Quincy Adams
 Charles Ball, an enslaved man famous for his epic journey to freedom, his service in the War of 1812 and his autobiography
 Harriet Elizabeth Brown, Calvert County school teacher, catalyst in education in Maryland and throughout the US for equal pay
 Judith Catchpole, an indentured servant who in 1656 was tried and acquitted of murdering her unborn child by one of the earliest all-female juries in the United States
 Brett Cecil, professional baseball pitcher for the Toronto Blue Jays and St. Louis Cardinals
 Cupid Childs, professional baseball player
 Tom Clancy, author
 Bernie Fowler, former Maryland State Senator and Patuxent River advocate
 Jon Franklin, two-time Pulitzer winner and author
 Louis L. Goldstein, former Comptroller of Maryland
 Earl F. Hance, Calvert County Commissioner and Secretary of the Maryland Department of Agriculture
 Doug Hill, WJLA-TV weatherman
 Al Hunt, Bloomberg News executive editor
 Thomas Johnson, first elected governor of Maryland, Continental Congress delegate, Associate Justice of the Supreme Court of the United States
 Joseph Kent, U.S. senator, governor of Maryland
 Cliff Kincaid, investigative journalist with Accuracy in Media and American Survival, Inc.
 Robert McClain, pro football player for the Atlanta Falcons
 Thomas V. Miller, Jr., Maryland Senate president
 J. C. Price, football coach
 Augustus Rhodes Sollers, congressman
 Arthur Storer, first astronomer in the American colonies, original namesake for Halley's Comet
 Roger Brooke Taney, Chief Justice of the United States, presided over the Dred Scott decision
 Margaret Taylor, First Lady of the United States, wife of President Zachary Taylor
 Robert Ulanowicz, theoretical ecologist
 Wax, rapper, singer, songwriter, musician, producer, and comedian
 Michael Willis, actor
 Judy Woodruff, news anchor and journalist

In popular culture
Calvert County has been the setting for several movies and television programs. The opening scene of the 1993 Clint Eastwood movie In the Line of Fire was filmed at Flag Harbor Marina in St. Leonard. More recently, the Calvert County Sheriff's Department has been featured on several reality television programs, including Speeders on the truTV network, MTV's Busted, and was featured weekly on A&E's Live PD.

See also
 Calvert County Fire-Rescue-EMS
 National Register of Historic Places listings in Calvert County, Maryland

References
Specific

General

External links

 
 
 

 
1654 establishments in Maryland
Populated places established in 1654
Maryland counties on the Chesapeake Bay